Saint Martin is an impact crater in Manitoba, Canada. It is located in the northern part of the Rural Municipality of Grahamdale, northwest of Lake St. Martin.

The crater is well preserved but poorly exposed at the surface as the whole region is covered by glacial drift.

Hypothetical multiple impact event 

It had previously been suggested by Geophysicist David Rowley of the University of Chicago, working with John Spray of the University of New Brunswick and Simon Kelley of the Open University, that the Saint Martin crater may have been part of a hypothetical multiple impact event which also formed the Manicouagan impact structure in northern Quebec, Rochechouart impact structure in France, Obolon' crater in Ukraine, and Red Wing crater in North Dakota. All of the craters had previously been known and studied, but their paleoalignment had never before been demonstrated. Rowley has said that the chance that these craters could be aligned like this due to chance are nearly zero.

References

External links 
 Earth Impact Database
 Aerial exploration of the St. Martin structure

Impact craters of Manitoba
Triassic impact craters
Triassic Canada